Pearl bodies are small (0.5 - 3.0 mm), lustrous, pearl-like food bodies produced from the epidermis of leaves, petioles and shoots of certain plants. They are rich in lipids, proteins and carbohydrates, and are sought after by various arthropods and ants, that carry out vigorous protection of the plant against herbivores, thus functioning as a biotic defence. They are globose or club-shaped on short peduncles, easily detached from the plant, and are food sources in the same sense as Beltian bodies, Müllerian bodies, Beccarian bodies, coccid secretions and nectaries. They occur in at least 19 plant families (1982) with tropical and subtropical distribution.

Cells or tissues that offer food rewards to arthropods are commonplace in the plant world and are an important way of establishing symbiotic relationships. Ants collect these energy-rich bodies (27.8 kJ/g dry weight) and carry them into their nests. Removal of these bodies appears to stimulate the formation of new ones in the same place.
The simultaneous presence of pearl bodies, ant domatia and extrafloral nectaries, suggest a facultative plant-ant mutualism. Early researchers dubbed these bodies 'perldrüsen' (Meyen 1837), 'pärlharen' (Nils Holmgren 1911) and 'perlules' (Kazimierz Stefan Rouppert 1926). Pearl bodies appear to be the primary, and possibly the only nutrient for ants inhabiting Central American myrmecophytes.

Phytophagous mites such as Tetranychus kanzawai have been observed feeding on pearl bodies produced by Cayratia japonica of the family Vitaceae, a family in which pearl bodies are common. It also appears possible that the predatory mite Euseius sojaensis uses the pearl bodies as an alternative food source.

Pearl bodies are important in the association between the ant species Pheidole bicornis and various Piper species that have spaces between the leaf petiole and stem suitable for use as ant domatia. Some Piper species have stems hollowed out by the ants, while others have naturally hollow stems. These tunnels are 3 – 4 mm in diameter, and, when the ants are in residence, numerous pearl bodies grow from the adaxial surfaces of the petioles, and from the tunnel walls. A study by Deborah K Letourneau in 1983 found that the ants were so sated by the plant's pearl bodies that more than half the insect eggs they encountered while patrolling were dropped to the ground. In Mallotus japonicus extrafloral nectaries and pearl bodies function as a biotic defence, while a second line of defence is made up trichomes and pellucid dots containing toxic secondary metabolites.

See also 
 Elaiosome
 Food bodies
 Gongylidia

External links 
 "The importance of petiole structure on inhabitability by ants"
 "Annals of Natural History"

Gallery

References 

Insect ecology
Plant physiology
Plant morphology
Herbivory
Antipredator adaptations